HMS Ferret is a training unit of the Royal Naval Reserve based at the Joint Intelligence Training Group (JITG), Chicksands in Bedfordshire.

History
HMS Ferret was initially established at Templer Barracks, Ashford, Kent, an Intelligence Corps training establishment, as a regional headquarters of the Royal Naval Reserve. It was commissioned on 9 October 1982.

Templer Barracks closed in 1997, the land being required for construction of railway works for the highspeed Eurostar connection through the newly completed Channel Tunnel. Training delivery and the Headquarters Int Corps moved to Chicksands between 1995 and 1997, with HMS Ferret relocating at the same time.

HMS Ferret is the headquarters of the Intelligence branch of the RNR.

See also
 Military intelligence

References

 Warlow, Ben, Shore Establishments of the Royal Navy, Liskeard : Maritime, 2000.

External links
 HMS Ferret Royal Navy website

 

Royal Navy bases in England
Royal Navy shore establishments
Military installations established in 1982